The Ludwig Boltzmann Gesellschaft (LBG) is an Austrian network of specialized research institutes that are not part of a university. It was founded in 1961 and named after physicist Ludwig Boltzmann. In 1999, the Ludwig Boltzmann Gesellschaft comprised 131 institutes in the fields of medicine, humanities and social sciences. After 2006, the number of institutes was greatly reduced.

Current institutes  
 LBI Applied Diagnostics
 LBI Archaeological Prospection and Virtual Reality
 LBI Cancer Research
 LBI Clinical Forensic Imaging
 LBI COPD and Respiratory Epidemiology 
 LBI Electrical Stimulation and Physical Rehabilitation 
 LBI Experimental and Clinical Traumatology
 LBI für Health Technology Assessment
 LBI History and Theory of Biography 
 LBI Human Rights 
 LBI Lung Vascular Research 
 LBI Neo-Latin Studies
 LBI Osteology
 LBI Rare and Undiagnosed Diseases

Current clusters  
 LBC Arthritis and Rehabilitation
 LBC Cardiovascular Research
 LBC History
 LBC Oncology

See also 
Ludwig Boltzmann Institute for Functional Brain Topography
Ludwig Boltzmann Institute for Neo-Latin Studies
Ludwig Boltzmann Institut für Menschenrechte

External links 

Education in Austria